Tsai Hsiao-hu (born 25 October 1962) is a Taiwanese Hokkien pop singer. He is nicknamed Prince of Pork as he worked in a family-owned pork butchery.

Tsai made his debut in 1991, and the next year won Best New Artists at the fourth Golden Melody Awards in 1992. Subsequently, he has received multiple nominations for the Golden Melody Awards, including in 2003, when three nominees for Best Taiwanese Language Singer, Chris Hung, Wang Shih-hsien, and Tsai unofficially shared the award due to a clerical error.

References

1962 births
Living people
Taiwanese Hokkien pop singers
20th-century Taiwanese  male singers
21st-century Taiwanese  male singers
Musicians from Kaohsiung